HMS Pevensey Castle was a  of the United Kingdom's Royal Navy. The ship was constructed during World War II and saw service during the war as a convoy escort. Following the war, the ship was converted into a weather ship and remained as such until being withdrawn from service in 1981 and scrapped in 1982.

Construction and career
Pevensey Castle, named for the castle in Pevensey, was built by Harland and Wolff in Belfast, and launched on 11 January 1944. The ship was commissioned in June 1944.

World War II

Weather ship
In 1960/61 she was converted at Blyth to the weather ship Weather Monitor. She was upgraded at the Manchester Dry Docks Company   
in 1976 and renamed Admiral Beaufort

Fate
She was withdrawn from service in 1981 and scrapped at Troon in 1982.

References

Publications

External links
 Pevensey Castle at weatherships.co.uk

 

Ships built in Belfast
Castle-class corvettes
1944 ships
Ships built by Harland and Wolff